Sá & Guarabyra, formerly Sá, Rodrix & Guarabyra, is a Brazilian folk rock duo hailing from Rio de Janeiro. They are famous for mixing rock music with traditional Brazilian caipira music, in a style they would call "rural rock".

History
The duo, initially a trio, was formed in 1971 by Luiz Carlos Sá, Guttemberg Guarabyra and José Rodrigues Trindade (better known as Zé Rodrix), who had recently left his previous band Som Imaginário. Their first studio album, Passado, Presente e Futuro, was released in the following year via Odeon Records to critical acclaim, and tours around Rio would come afterwards. In 1973 the trio reached higher fame after composing a jingle for a Pepsi commercial, "Só Tem Amor Quem Tem Amor pra Dar"; however, Rodrix, saying that he was tired of so much touring and performances, would part ways with Sá and Guarabyra shortly afterwards, and began a solo career. Sá and Guarabyra would then remain as a duo.

In 1982, the duo partaked at the Festival de Música Popular Brasileira with the song "Dona". "Dona" would be covered by pop rock group Roupa Nova, and after Roupa Nova's version appeared in the soundtrack of the popular telenovela Roque Santeiro, it became one of the most played songs in the radios in 1985. Numerous other songs by the duo would feature on the telenovelas soundtrack as well. They also collaborated with Flávio Venturini for their song "Espanhola", that was co-written by him.

In 2001, Zé Rodrix rejoined Sá and Guarabyra for a show promoting the band's 30th anniversary, and would stay with them until his death in 2009.

Discography

With Zé Rodrix
 1972: Passado, Presente e Futuro
 1973: Terra
 2001: Outra Vez na Estrada (live album)
 2009: Amanhã

Without Zé Rodrix

 1974: Nunca
 1975: Cadernos de Viagem
 1977: Pirão de Peixe com Pimenta
 1979: Quatro
 1982: Dez Anos Juntos (live album)
 1984: Paraíso Agora
 1986: Harmonia
 1988: Cartas, Canções e Palavras
 1990: Vamos por Aí
 1994: Sá & Guarabyra
 1997: Rio-Bahia
 1999: Orquestra Sinfônica de Americana ao Vivo (live album)

References

External links
 Sá & Guarabyra at Discogs

Musical groups established in 1971
Brazilian musical duos
1971 establishments in Brazil
Musical groups from Rio de Janeiro (city)
Sertanejo music groups
Brazilian folk rock groups
Sertanejo musicians